Delias oraia is a butterfly in the family Pieridae. It was described by William Doherty in 1891. It is found in the Australasian realm.

Subspecies
D. o. oraia (Lombok, Sumbawa)
D. o. adonarensis Rothschild, 1925 (Adonara, Alor)
D. o. bratana Kalis, 1941 (Bali)
D. o. lydia Fruhstorfer, 1897 (Flores)
D. o. solorensis Yagishita & Nakano, 1993 (Solor)

References

External links
Delias at Markku Savela's Lepidoptera and Some Other Life Forms

oraia
Butterflies described in 1891